Events from the year 1976 in North Korea.

Incumbents
Premier: Kim Il (until 19 April), Pak Song-chol (starting 19 April)
Supreme Leader: Kim Il-sung

Events
Korean axe murder incident

Births

 20 November - Ji Yun-nam.

Deaths

 7 March - Nam Il.

See also
Years in Japan
Years in South Korea

References

 
North Korea
1970s in North Korea
Years of the 20th century in North Korea
North Korea